John Paulet may refer to:
Sir John Paulet (fl. 1497–1501), soldier; commander at the battle of Blackheath, 1497
John Paulet, 2nd Marquess of Winchester (c. 1510–1576)
John Paulet, 5th Marquess of Winchester (c. 1598–1675)
John Paulet, 14th Marquess of Winchester (1801–1887), British peer and soldier

See also 
 John Poulett (disambiguation)